Bradáčov is a municipality and village in Tábor District in the South Bohemian Region of the Czech Republic. It has about 50 inhabitants.

Administrative parts
The village of Horní Světlá is an administrative part of Bradáčov.

References

Villages in Tábor District